David M. Gubow is a judge in Michigan and a former Democratic member of the Michigan House of Representatives.

A graduate of the University of Michigan, Gubow earned his bachelor's degree in urban studies and a varsity letter for hockey. He later went on to study law at the University of Detroit and was admitted to the bar in 1975.

He was elected to the House in 1984 and was re-elected six more times before term limits prevented him from further service there. He was elected assistant clerk of the House in 1999, serving there until 2002.

In 2002, Gubow was elected a district judge in Oakland County. He was re-elected in 2008 and 2014. Gubow was chief judge of the court from 2003 through 2007, and presently serves as chief judge pro tem.

Gubow's father, Lawrence, was a federal prosecutor from 1961 through 1968, and federal judge from 1968 until his death in 1978.

References

1949 births
Living people
Democratic Party members of the Michigan House of Representatives
Michigan state court judges
University of Michigan College of Literature, Science, and the Arts alumni
University of Detroit Mercy alumni